Bergedorf is a quarter in the borough of Hamburg in northern Germany. In 2020, the population was 36,160.

History
The quarter was first mentioned in 1162. The today's quarter is the old city Bergedorf and located on the river Bille, a right tributary of the Elbe.

Geography
Bergedorf, situated in the south-eastern side of Hamburg, borders with the quarters of Lohbrügge, Billwerder, Allermöhe, Curslack and Altengamme; and with the district of Herzogtum Lauenburg, in Schleswig-Holstein.

Politics
These are the results of Bergedorf in the Hamburg state election:

Demographics 

In 2006 in the quarter Bergedorf were living 40,678 people. In 1999 there were 19,603 households and 38% of all households were made up of individuals.

According to the Department of Motor Vehicles (Kraftfahrt-Bundesamt), in the quarter Bergedorf were 15.104 private cars registered (372 cars/1000 people).

There were 8 elementary schools and 5 secondary schools in the quarter Bergedorf and 112 physicians in private practice and 12 pharmacies.

Unlike the mere quarters of Hamburg, Bergedorf still has its own town hall in being.

Notable present or former residents 
 Johann Adolph Hasse
 Heinrich Rathmann
 Friedrich Chrysander
 Ida Boy-Ed
 Ferdinand Pfohl
 Bernhard Schmidt
 Anton Aloys Timpe
 Kurt A. Körber
 Frank Appel
 Jörg Pilawa
 Wolfe+585, Senior, a.k.a. Hubert Blaine Wolfe, Held the Guinness Book of World Records Longest Name in 1978

See also
Hamburg-Bergedorf station

References

 Statistisches Amt für Hamburg und Schleswig-Holstein, official website (in German)
 Lichtwark-Heft. Verlag HB-Werbung, Hamburg-Bergedorf. .

External links

 Bergedorf official site
Locator map of Bergedorf in Hamburg (de.wp)

Quarters of Hamburg
Bergedorf